Adaina ambrosiae (ambrosia plume moth or ragweed plume moth) is a moth of the family Pterophoridae. It is found in North America from California east to Florida and north to Ontario. It is also known from Bermuda, Costa Rica, Jamaica, Puerto Rico and the Virgin Islands.

The forewings are brownish‑white and the markings are dark brown. The hindwings and fringes are grey. Adults are on wing nearly year round in the southern part of their range.

The larvae feed on Ambrosia artemissiifolia, Ambrosia acanthicarpa, Ambrosia chamissonis, Ambrosia confertiflora, Ambrosia dumosa, Ambrosia eriocentra, Ambrosia cumanensis, Pluchea rosea, Melanthera nivea, Helianthus annuus, Helianthus tuberosa, Xanthium strumarium and Cynara scolymus. They skeletonize the leaves of their host plant. They rest along the midrib of the upper leaf surface in depressions which they carve into the leaves.

Etymology
The specific name refers to one of the host plants, Ambrosia.

References

Oidaematophorini
Moths of North America
Moths described in 1880